Wodehouse Playhouse is a British television comedy series based on the short stories of P. G. Wodehouse. From 1974 to 1978, a pilot and three series were made, with 21 half-hour episodes altogether in the entire series. The series has been released on home video.

Production

P. G. Wodehouse introduced the episodes in the first series. These introductions were filmed in January 1975, shortly before his death.

The pilot episode aired in the anthology series Comedy Playhouse. The first and second series of Wodehouse Playhouse initially aired on BBC1. Reruns of these episodes aired on BBC2 in 1977, and the third series first aired on BBC2. The episodes were broadcast in the US on PBS television stations. In 2003, the series was released on home video.

David Climie adapted all the episodes, including the pilot. The first series was produced by David Askey, the second series was produced by Michael Mills, and the third series was produced by Gareth Gwenlan.

With the exception of the pilot, John Alderton featured in all episodes, and his wife Pauline Collins was in all of the episodes in the first and second series. Geraldine Newman was featured in the first series. Sally Thomsett and Liza Goddard were among the actresses who were featured during the third series.

As each episode is a stand-alone adaptation of a different short story, Alderton and Collins play different parts in each show in which they appear.  While they are often romantically linked, there are several episodes where they pair up with a different character. Most of the stories are culled from the Mr. Mulliner stories. The series also includes episodes based on some of the Oldest Member golf stories, and some of the stories that revolve around the Drones Club.

Episodes

Pilot (1974)

Series 1 (1975)

Series 2 (1976)

Series 3 (1978)

Reception
In his book P. G. Wodehouse and Hollywood: Screenwriting, Satires and Adaptations, Brian Taves considered that the first series of Wodehouse Playhouse as a whole did not convey the sophisticated wit of Wodehouse's stories, while sometimes capturing other elements such as their slapstick humour. Taves thought that the quality of the series significantly improved in the second series, with episodes, especially "Strychnine in the Soup", effectively conveying Wodehouse's satire of different genres and character types. Taves believed this improvement was largely due to the second series producer Michael Mills, who had experience from his involvement with the earlier Wodehouse television programmes The World of Wooster and The World of Wodehouse. According to Taves, the third series, produced by Gareth Gwenlan, generally maintained the high quality of the second series, with "The Editor Regrets" in particular being ideally adapted.

Taves compared Wodehouse Playhouse to the 1924 Stoll Pictures short film series The Clicking of Cuthbert, adapted from Wodehouse's golf stories. Both series have episode running times of about half an hour, which Taves found to be the ideal length for capturing a short story on screen without overly condensing or stretching the story. Taves also thought that both series attempted to balance the humour of the source material with additional slapstick scenes intended to make the stories more humorous on screen. However, Taves believed that these additions sometimes interrupted the pacing in both series. A significant difference between the two series is that Wodehouse Playhouse greatly benefitted from the actors' inflection of the dialogue, which was limited to intertitles in the 1924 silent films.

References
Notes

Sources

External links
 

1974 British television series debuts
1978 British television series endings
1970s British comedy television series
Television shows based on works by P. G. Wodehouse
BBC television comedy
BBC television sitcoms